Selena Marie Gomez (born July 22, 1992) is an American singer, actress, producer, and businesswoman. Gomez began her acting career on the children's television series Barney & Friends (2002–2004). As a teenager, she rose to prominence for starring as Alex Russo on the Disney Channel television series Wizards of Waverly Place (2007–2012). Alongside her television career, Gomez appeared in the films Another Cinderella Story (2008), Wizards of Waverly Place: The Movie (2009), Ramona and Beezus (2010), Monte Carlo (2011), Spring Breakers (2012), Neighbors 2: Sorority Rising (2016), and The Dead Don't Die (2019), and voiced Mavis in the Hotel Transylvania film franchise (2012–2022).

Gomez executive produced the Netflix television series 13 Reasons Why (2017–2020) and Living Undocumented (2019) through her production company, July Moon Productions. Additionally, she executive produces and stars in the HBO Max cooking series Selena + Chef (2020–2022) and the Hulu mystery-comedy series Only Murders in the Building (2021–present). The latter earned Gomez critical praise, and nominations for a Golden Globe Award, and as producer, a Primetime Emmy Award.

Gomez released three albums with her former band, Selena Gomez & the Scene, all of which reached the top ten of the US Billboard 200 and were certified gold by the Recording Industry Association of America (RIAA): Kiss & Tell (2009), A Year Without Rain (2010), and When the Sun Goes Down (2011). Her debut solo album, Stars Dance (2013), topped the U.S. Billboard 200, while its lead single, "Come & Get It", reached the top ten in the US Billboard Hot 100. Gomez's second studio album Revival (2015), debuted at number one in the US, was certified platinum by the RIAA, and spawned three US top-ten entries: "Good for You", "Same Old Love", "Hands to Myself". Her third studio album, Rare (2020), became her third consecutive number one in the US, and its lead single, "Lose You to Love Me", her first number-one song in the US and Canada. In 2021, she released the Spanish-language EP Revelación, for which she received a nomination for the Grammy Award for Best Latin Pop Album.

She has received various accolades and was named Billboard Woman of the Year in 2017, and she also broke 15 Guinness World Records. Time magazine named her one of the 100 most influential people in the world in 2020. She has a large following on social media and is the most followed woman on Instagram. Gomez's other ventures include makeup, clothing, handbag and fragrance lines. She has worked with many charitable organizations and served as a UNICEF ambassador since age 17.

Early life
Selena Marie Gomez was born on July 22, 1992, in Grand Prairie, Texas, to Ricardo Joel Gomez and Texas-born former stage actress Mandy Teefey. She was named after Tejano singer Selena Quintanilla, who died in 1995. Her father is of Mexican descent, while her mother, who was adopted, has Italian ancestry. Gomez's paternal grandparents emigrated to Texas from Monterrey in the 1970s. Of her heritage, Gomez has said she is "a proud third-generation American-Mexican" and "My family does have quinceañeras, and we go to the communion church. We do everything that's Catholic, but we don't really have anything traditional except go to the park and have barbecues on Sundays after church." Gomez was fluent in Spanish until age seven. Her parents divorced when she was five years old, and she remained with her mother. Gomez has two younger half-sisters and a younger stepbrother: Gracie Elliot Teefey, through Mandy and her second husband, Brian Teefey, and Victoria "Tori" and Marcus Gomez, through Ricardo and his second wife, Sara. She earned her high-school diploma through homeschooling in May 2010.

Gomez was born when her mother was 16 years old. The family had financial troubles throughout Gomez's childhood, her mother struggling to provide for the pair. At one point, Gomez recalls that they had to search for quarters just to get gas for their car. Her mother later recalled that the two would frequently walk to their local dollar store to buy spaghetti for dinner. Gomez has said, "I was frustrated that my parents weren't together, and never saw the light at the end of the tunnel where my mom was working hard to provide a better life for me. I'm terrified of what I would have become if I'd stayed [in Texas]." She later added that her mother "was really strong around me. Having me at 16 had to have been a big responsibility. She gave up everything for me, had three jobs, supported me, sacrificed her life for me." Gomez had a close relationship with her grandparents as a child and appeared in various pageants. Her grandparents often took care of her while her parents finished their schooling, and she has said they "raised her" until she found success in show business.

Career

2002–2006: Career beginnings
Gomez first gained an interest in pursuing a career in entertainment watching her mother prepare for stage productions. In 2002, she began her acting career on the children's television series Barney & Friends, portraying the character Gianna. The show was her first acting gig. Gomez recalled of the experience, "I was very shy when I was little [...] I didn't know what 'camera right' was. I didn't know what blocking was. I learned everything from Barney." Gomez appeared in thirteen episodes of the show between 2002 and 2004; the show's producers released her as she was "too old" for the series. While working on Barney & Friends, Gomez had bit part roles in the film Spy Kids 3-D: Game Over (2003) and the made-for-television film Walker, Texas Ranger: Trial by Fire (2005). She guest starred in a 2006 episode of the Disney Channel series The Suite Life of Zack & Cody.

2007–2012: Breakthrough with Disney and Selena Gomez & the Scene

Gomez was given a recurring role on the Disney Channel series Hannah Montana in 2007 as pop star Mikayla. During this time, Gomez filmed pilot episodes for two potential Disney Channel series; the first was a Suite Life spin-off titled Arwin!, and the second was a Lizzie McGuire spin-off titled What's Stevie Thinking?. She later auditioned for a role in the network's series Wizards of Waverly Place, ultimately winning the lead role of Alex Russo. Gomez and her mother subsequently moved to Los Angeles. Wizards of Waverly Place saw Gomez playing a teenage girl in a family of wizards who own a restaurant in New York City. The series quickly became a success for the Disney Channel and represented Gomez's breakthrough into the mainstream. The role of Alex Russo brought Gomez "teen idol" status. It received numerous awards and nominations, and won the Primetime Emmy Award for Outstanding Children's Program. It garnered positive reviews, with Gomez's being particularly praised for her comic timing and sarcastic delivery.

While working on the second season of Wizards of Waverly Place, Gomez voiced Helga in the animated film Horton Hears a Who! (2008). The film was a critical and commercial success, grossing nearly $300 million worldwide. Gomez had a leading role as an aspiring dancer Mary Santiago in Another Cinderella Story (2008), the second installment of the A Cinderella Story series, released on direct-to-video. She won the Young Artist Award for Best Performance in a TV Movie, Miniseries, or Special – Leading Young Actress for the role. She contributed three songs to the soundtrack, including the single "Tell Me Something I Don't Know", which was her first ever entry on the U.S. Billboard Hot 100 chart. She also recorded the original song "Fly to Your Heart" for the soundtrack of the animated film Tinker Bell (2008).

At age 16, Gomez signed a record deal with Hollywood Records. Gomez formed her own production company in 2008, which she called July Moon Productions. She partnered with XYZ Films for the project, allowing Gomez to option articles, hire writers and create talent packages to shop to studios. Gomez was slated to release two films under the company. The first, titled What Boys Want, would feature Gomez as a girl who could hear the thoughts of men. She later announced a film adaptation of the novel Thirteen Reasons Why, in which she was to play a young girl who commits suicide; ultimately, neither film was made, but Gomez would later executive produce a television adaptation of Thirteen Reasons Why.

Gomez continued to enjoy mainstream success throughout the following year, appearing as Alex Russo in a crossover episode of the Disney Channel series The Suite Life on Deck in 2009. She also guest starred as herself on the Disney Channel series Sonny with a Chance. Gomez, along with Demi Lovato, starred in the Disney Channel film Princess Protection Program, which aired in June 2009. The film had a total of 8.5 million viewers during its premiere. For the film's soundtrack, Lovato and Gomez released the song "One and the Same", which charted at number eighty-second in the U.S. She next starred in Wizards of Waverly Place: The Movie, a television film based on the series. The film premiered in August to an audience of 11.4 million viewers, becoming cable's number-one scripted telecast of the year and was the second-most watched TV movie on cable, behind High School Musical 2. Roxana Hadadi of The Washington Post credited all three performers—Gomez, David Henrie and Jake T. Austin—for their "acting skills that carry the film". The film won the series its second consecutive Emmy for Outstanding Children's Program at the 62nd Primetime Emmy Awards. Gomez recorded three songs on the television series and film's soundtrack, including the single "Magic", which reached number sixty-one in the U.S.

Hoping to cross over into the music industry, Gomez formed the pop rock band Selena Gomez & the Scene through her record deal with Hollywood Records. The name of the band is an "ironic jab" at the people who called Gomez a "wannabe scene". The group released their first studio album, Kiss & Tell, in August 2009, which debuted at number nine on the Billboard 200 albums chart in the U.S. with first-week sales of 66,000 copies. The album received mixed reviews, with some critics praising its "fun" nature and others criticizing Gomez's vocal performance. Although the lead single was not commercially successful, the second single, "Naturally", reached number twenty-nine in the U.S. and number seven in the United Kingdom, and was certified 4× Platinum by the Recording Industry Association of America (RIAA).

In July 2010, Gomez starred alongside Joey King in Ramona and Beezus, a film adaptation of the children's novel series by Beverly Cleary, in which she portrayed Beezus Quimby. The film was well received by critics; Roger Ebert described it as "a sweet salute," and found both actresses "appealing". Selena Gomez & the Scene released their second studio album A Year Without Rain that same year, which debuted on the U.S. Billboard 200 at number four with sales of over 66,000. The album received mixed to positive reviews, where some critics reacting negatively to Gomez's Auto-Tuned vocals. Both of the record's singles, "Round & Round" and "A Year Without Rain", achieved moderate success. The band was awarded Favorite Breakout Artist at the 37th People's Choice Awards. Gomez reprised the voice role of Princess Selenia in Arthur 3: The War of the Two Worlds.

Selena Gomez & the Scene released their third and final studio album, When the Sun Goes Down, in June 2011, to mixed reviews. It debuted at number four on the U.S. Billboard 200 with first-week sales of 78,000 copies, and peaked at number three the following week. The album's lead single, "Who Says", was the band's highest charting effort, peaking at number twenty-one in the U.S. Its second single, "Love You like a Love Song", went on to become the band's highest performing single in the U.S. to date, peaking at number twenty-two on the Billboard Hot 100, where it spent 38 weeks, and reached the top ten in Canada, and was certified 5× Platinum by the RIAA. In 2022, Billboard ranked the song as the biggest song that peaked at number twenty-two. The band's three studio albums have all been certified gold by the RIAA. For two years in a row (2010–2011), Billboard magazine ranked Gomez third in their list of 21 Under 21: Music's Hottest Minors, an annual ranking of the most popular musicians under the age of 21.

Gomez starred in the comedy film Monte Carlo (2011), with Leighton Meester and Katie Cassidy; she played the lead role of Grace, a teenager "mistaken for a socialite", Cordelia (also Gomez), "while on a trip to Paris". In preparation for the role, she learned to play polo and received dialect coaching to speak in two different British accents; Gomez's accent was described as "unconvincing". The film received mixed reviews from critic. Nick Schager from Slant Magazine found Gomez "cute, but too bland to lend the proceedings any vivid character, except for the few scenes that allow her to indulge her cold, sarcastic, nasty side as Cordelia". That year, Gomez appeared in a cameo role in the film The Muppets. Gomez hosted in June the MuchMusic Video Awards in Toronto, Canada, and in November the MTV Europe Music Awards in Belfast, Northern Ireland.

2012–2014: Stars Dance and films
Gomez confirmed in January 2012 that she would be taking a break from music, placing Selena Gomez & the Scene on hiatus. That year, Wizards of Waverly Place officially ended its run on the Disney Channel after four seasons. Gomez was cast as Mavis in the animated film Hotel Transylvania, which premiered at the 37th annual Toronto International Film Festival in September 2012, and released in theaters the same month to mixed reviews. The film was a commercial success, grossing $358 million worldwide. 

Gomez was part of the ensemble cast of the controversial exploitation Harmony Korine-directed Spring Breakers (2012), starring James Franco, Vanessa Hudgens, Ashley Benson and Rachel Korine. The film premiered at the 69th Venice International Film Festival in September, and was released the following year. The story followed four college-aged girls who decide to rob a fast food restaurant in order to pay for their spring break. It saw Gomez playing a more mature character than she did previously and reportedly led to her having a "bit of a meltdown on set". Spring Breakers polarized audiences; the film received generally positive reviews from critics, and ranked in BBC's 100 Greatest Films of the 21st Century. 

In 2013, Gomez starred alongside Ethan Hawke in the action thriller Getaway, in which she played a young hacker. The film was a critical and commercial failure, and earned Gomez a nomination for Worst Actress at the 34th Golden Raspberry Awards. Christopher Orr of The Atlantic described her as "a kid trying desperately to act like a grownup, but with no real idea what that might entail". Gomez also served as executive producer and starred on the Disney Channel special The Wizards Return: Alex vs. Alex (2013).

Despite earlier claims that she would be taking a break from music, Gomez announced in March 2013 the release of her solo debut album. In April 2013, Gomez released "Come & Get It" as the lead single. It became Gomez's first top-ten entry on the U.S. Billboard Hot 100, reaching number six. The song also reached the top ten on charts in Canada and the U.K. The second single, "Slow Down", peaked at number twenty-seven in the U.S. Stars Dance was released in July 2013. The record is musically rooted in EDM and electropop. It became her first album to debut at number one in the U.S., selling 97,000 copies in its first week, and also reached number one in Canada. It received mixed reviews from music critics, with some noticing her inability to create her own musical identity and panning her vocal abilities. Gomez incorporated choreographed dance routines into the album's music videos and her promotional live performances, having been inspired by artists such as Janet Jackson and Britney Spears. The video of "Come & Get It" won the Best Pop Video at the 2013 MTV Video Music Awards.

Gomez began her Stars Dance Tour in August 2013. After playing shows in North America and Europe, Gomez canceled the Australian and Asian legs of the tour in December 2013, claiming that she would be taking a hiatus to spend time with her family. In January 2014, it was reported that Gomez had spent two weeks at Dawn at The Meadows, which is a treatment center in Wickenburg, Arizona that specializes in treating addiction and trauma in young people. Her representative stated that she had spent time there "voluntarily [...] but not for substance abuse". Gomez confirmed in 2015 that she had been diagnosed with lupus and that after canceling the tour she entered rehab to undergo chemotherapy. 

Gomez played Nina Pennington, an innocent straight-A student, in Behaving Badly (2014). The project, filmed prior to Gomez's stint in rehab, was released in August to a generally negative critical and commercial reception. The author of the original autobiographical novel disavowed the film. However, critics deemed Gomez's performance superior to the film; Stephen Dalton from The Hollywood Reporter wrote: "Gomez gives the one-dimensional Nina an emotional maturity that deserves a better movie than this". Gomez also had a supporting role in the drama Rudderless (2014), the directorial debut of William H. Macy. The independent film premiered at the 2014 Sundance Film Festival, and received a mixed reception from critics. Gomez recorded the song "Hold On" with Ben Kweller for the film's soundtrack. At the 2014 Teen Choice Awards, Gomez was honored with the Ultimate Choice Award for her "contributions to the entertainment world".

In April of that year, it was reported that Gomez had fired her mother and stepfather as her managers, who had served in those roles since the beginning of her career. Gomez later signed with the WME and Brillstein companies to manage her career. The news of Gomez's new management also fueled rumors that her contract with Hollywood Records was coming to an end and that she was searching for a new label. Gomez surprise-released her new single "The Heart Wants What It Wants" in November 2014, and confirmed after months of speculation that she would be releasing a compilation album as a means of finishing out her contract with Hollywood Records. The single became her second top-ten hit in the U.S. That same month, Gomez released her first solo compilation album, For You. The album entered the U.S. Billboard 200 at number twenty-four. Gomez officially parted ways with Hollywood Records and later signed with Interscope Records in December 2014.

2015–2016: Revival 
While working on her second studio album, Gomez collaborated with Zedd on "I Want You to Know", released in February 2015, and reached the top twenty in the U.S. In May, she appeared in Taylor Swift's music video for "Bad Blood". Gomez released "Good for You" featuring rapper ASAP Rocky as the lead single from her second studio album, in June. The song debuted at number one on the Digital Songs chart with first-week sales of 179,000 copies—the best sales week in Gomez's career for a single. It was the chart's first number-one debut since Swift's "Blank Space" (2014). "Good for You" became Gomez's first top-five single on the Billboard Hot 100, and her first single to top the Mainstream Top 40 chart. It also reached the top ten on charts in Australia and Canada. Gomez later reprised the voice role of Mavis in Hotel Transylvania 2 (2015); the film was met with a positive critical reception and commercial success upon release, grossing $474 million worldwide. She was awarded Favorite Animated Movie Voice at the 42nd People's Choice Awards.

Gomez released her second studio album, Revival, in October 2015. It is primarily a dance-pop and electropop record with R&B vibes. The album was reviewed positively by critics, who praised its production and lyrical content. Writing for Rolling Stone, Brittany Spanos stated that "Revival is an audacious name for a 23-year-old singer's second album, but from start to finish, Gomez earns it," noting that "[t]his is the sound of a newly empowered pop artist growing into her strengths like never before." Kristen S.Hé of Billboard called it "one of the most influential pop albums of the late 2010s." The album debuted at number one on the U.S. Billboard 200 with first-week sales of 117,000 album units, and was certified platinum by the RIAA. It remains Gomez's highest first-week sales to date. "Same Old Love" was released as the album's second single and topped the Mainstream Top 40 chart. It also peaked at number five in the U.S., tying with "Good for You" as Gomez's highest-charting single at the time. "Hands to Myself" served as the album's third single and became her third consecutive number one on the Mainstream Top 40, making Gomez one of only six female artists to have three singles from the same album top the chart. The single also peaked within the top ten in the U.S. For her performance on Billboard’s music charts, Gomez received the Chart-Topper Award at the 2015 Billboard Women in Music event.

Gomez was a key advisor during the ninth season of the reality singing competition The Voice. She made a cameo appearance in Adam McKay's film The Big Short (2015). She then starred as Dot, a young runaway hitchhiker, in the comedy-drama The Fundamentals of Caring with Paul Rudd, which premiered at the 2016 Sundance Film Festival in January, and was released on Netflix five months later. The film received a positive critical response; Tristram Fane Saunders of The Daily Telegraph described Gomez's performance as "impressive" and "mature". Gomez performed as the musical guest on an episode of the NBC late-night sketch comedy Saturday Night Live in January 2016. "Kill Em with Kindness" was released as the Revivals fourth and final single four months later. Gomez played the president of a sorority in the comedy Neighbors 2: Sorority Rising (2016); the film received mixed to positive reviews.

Gomez embarked on her worldwide Revival Tour in May 2016. She claimed that the tour would focus solely on her as an artist and would feature less choreography and fewer effects than her previous tour. Gomez began working on her third studio album while touring and added a new song titled "Feel Me" to the setlist of her Revival Tour. The song was later released in February 2020, due to high demand from fans. After touring in North America, Asia and Oceania, she canceled the European and South America legs in August 2016 due to anxiety, panic attacks and depression caused by her lupus. 
Gomez featured on Charlie Puth's single, "We Don't Talk Anymore". The song was an international success, and reached the top ten in the U.S., Australia, Canada, France, and topped the charts in Italy; and was certified 5× Platinum by the RIAA. As of December 2022, the music video has gained more than 2.9 billion views on YouTube, making it the 37th most-viewed video and the most-viewed music video published in 2016 on the site. Gomez had a supporting role in In Dubious Battle (2016) starring and directed by James Franco. The film had its world premiere at the 73rd Venice International Film Festival, and was met with underwhelming reviews. She also guest starred in the Comedy Central variety sketch series Inside Amy Schumer. Gomez and Canadian singer Tory Lanez were featured on Norwegian DJ Cashmere Cat's single, "Trust Nobody".

Following the cancelation of her tour, Gomez rechecked into rehab to focus on her mental health and was noticeably absent from social media. At that time, she was the most followed person on Instagram and became the first person to reach 100 million followers. She is currently the most followed woman on the platform. Gomez made her first public appearance since entering rehab at the 2016 American Music Awards, where she was nominated for Favorite Pop/Rock Female Artist and Artist of the Year, the first of which she won. Gomez also won Biggest Triple Threat at the 2016 iHeartRadio Music Awards, and was nominated for two awards at the 2016 Billboard Music Awards, including Top Female Artist. Gomez was also named to Forbes 30 Under 30 list in the music category, and again in 2020 in its "All-Star Alumni" category.

2017–2019: Standalone releases and 13 Reasons Why
Gomez and the Norwegian DJ Kygo released a single together, "It Ain't Me", in February 2017. The collaboration reached top ten of most major music charts worldwide, including the U.S. and the U.K., and attained top five peaks in Australia, Canada, Germany and many European countries. The song received nominations at major awards around the world, including Top Dance/Electronic Song at the 2018 Billboard Music Awards.

Gomez served as executive producer for the series adaptation of the novel Thirteen Reasons Why. The show premiered on Netflix in March 2017. The series drew backlash from various mental health charities and suicide prevention communities over "dangerous content", with some people feeling the show glamorized suicide. Gomez addressed the controversy, saying that "We stayed very true to the book and that's initially what [author] Jay Asher created was a beautifully tragic, complicated yet suspenseful story and I think that's what we wanted to do. We wanted to do it justice and, yeah, [the backlash is] gonna come no matter what. It's not an easy subject to talk about, but I'm very fortunate with how it's doing. Despite the controversy, the first season was a critical success. However, the other three seasons received generally negative reviews. 13 Reasons Why was the most tweeted about show of 2017, and the most-watched original streaming series of 2018. In 2022, its second season ranks as the ninth most watched English-language television series on Netflix, with 496.1million hours viewed within 28 days of release. The series ended after four seasons in June 2020. Gomez recorded a cover version of the song "Only You" for the series' first season soundtrack.

In May 2017, Gomez released the single "Bad Liar", alongside a vertical music video which was available for streaming only through Spotify; it was the first-ever music video to premiere on Spotify. The song received universal acclaim from music critics, with some deeming it Gomez's best song to date; Billboard ranked it as the best song of 2017. Rolling Stone ranked "Bad Liar" at number 39 on its 2019 list of best songs of the 2010s. Winston Cook-Wilson of Spin magazine found Gomez's vocals pristine and the track "charmingly weird", calling its lyrics and sample usage "harebrained but ultimately brilliant". He appreciated "Bad Liar" for eschewing contemporary radio trends, concluding that it "mostly just sounds like itself, and there's no higher compliment to pay it. Gomez released the single "Fetish" featuring rapper Gucci Mane two month later. In October 2017, Gomez and EDM producer Marshmello released the single "Wolves". The song was a commercial success, and reached the top ten on charts in Australia, Canada, the U.K, and several European countries, peaking at number twenty in the U.S. Later that year, Gomez was named Billboards Woman of the Year, in recognition of her influence and commercial success.

In May 2018, Gomez released the single "Back to You", from the 13 Reasons Why Season 2 Soundtrack. The song reached the top five on charts in Australia and Canada, and peaked at number eighteen in the U.S. Gomez once again voiced the character Mavis in Hotel Transylvania 3: Summer Vacation, released in July of that year. With box office earnings of $528 million, the film was a commercial success, and received mixed to positive reviews. Gomez featured on DJ Snake's song "Taki Taki" alongside Ozuna and Cardi B, released in September 2018. The single achieved global success, reaching the top ten in Canada, France, Germany, Italy, and topped the charts in Spain and several Latin American countries. It also peaked at number eleven in the U.S. The song received nominations for the Billboard Music Award and the iHeartRadio Music Award for Latin Song of the Year, but ultimately won Song of the Year at the 2019 Latin American Music Awards. From 2011 to 2018, Gomez had a streak of 16 consecutive top 40 hits on the Billboard Hot 100, which is the longest active run of any artist according to Billboard. Gomez also featured on Julia Michaels's single "Anxiety", released in January 2019, and released the following month a collaboration with Tainy, Benny Blanco and J Balvin, titled "I Can't Get Enough".

Gomez appeared in Jim Jarmusch's comedy horror The Dead Don't Die (2019). The film had its world premiere at the 2019 Cannes Film Festival, where it generated mixed reviews. That year, she starred in Woody Allen's romantic comedy A Rainy Day in New York, with Timothée Chalamet and Elle Fanning. Due to a resurgence of the 1992 sexual abuse allegation against Allen prompted by the Me Too movement, Gomez made a donation of over $1 million, exceeding her salary from the film, to the Time's Up initiative. The film received mixed reviews from critics, but Gomez's performance was praised; Variety'''s Jessica Kiang wrote: "Gomez comes out the best of the younger cast, husking her way through some of the films better lines." Gomez served as an executive producer for the Netflix docuseries Living Undocumented, released in October 2019, 
which follows eight undocumented families in America. The docuseries was a critical success. According to an op-ed written by Gomez for Time on October 1, 2019, Gomez said she was approached about the project in 2017 and decided to become involved after watching footage that captured "the shame, uncertainty, and fear I saw my own family struggle with. But it also captured the hope, optimism, and patriotism so many undocumented immigrants still hold in their hearts despite the hell they go through.”

2020–present: Rare, Revelación and Only Murders in the Building
In October 2019, Gomez released "Lose You to Love Me" as the lead single from her third studio album. The next day, she surprise-released the album's second single, "Look at Her Now". "Lose You to Love Me" became her first number-one song in the U.S. and Canada, and reached the top five of various national charts worldwide, including Australia and the U.K. Rare was released in January 2020, and debuted atop the U.S. Billboard 200, earning 112,000 album-equivalent units in its first week. It became her third consecutive number-one album in the U.S., and topped the charts in Australia, Canada, and several other territories, peaking at number two in the UK. The album received positive reviews from music critics, who praised its production and cohesiveness, with many calling it Gomez's best album to date; Jem Aswad of Variety labeled Rare "one of the best pop albums to be released in recent memory" and described it as "sophisticated, precisely written and expertly produced music". Other singles released from the album include "Rare" and "Boyfriend".

In January 2020, Gomez voiced a giraffe in the adventure film Dolittle, directed by Stephen Gaghan. The film starring Robert Downey Jr. was a box office disappointment, and received negative reviews from critics, who called it "too long [and] lifeless." Gomez hosted and executive produce the HBO Max cooking show Selena + Chef, which features Gomez joined by a different chef each episode remotely due to the COVID-19 pandemic. Each episode highlights a food-related charity. The show premiered in August 2020, and was well received by critics. In June, Gomez featured in a remix of Trevor Daniel's song, "Past Life". She executive produced two films this year; the romantic comedy The Broken Hearts Gallery, released in September 2020, to positive reviews, and the teen comedy-drama This Is the Year. In August, Gomez collaborated with South Korean girl group Blackpink for "Ice Cream". The song peaked at number thirteen on the Billboard Hot 100, and garnered 79.08 million views in its first 24 hours, marking the third biggest 24-hour debut for a music video on YouTube at the time. That year, Gomez was honored by The Latin Recording Academy as one of the Leading Ladies of Entertainment. She was also named by Time as one of the 100 most influential people in the world.

Gomez released her first Spanish-language project, an EP titled Revelación, in March 2021. It debuted at number twenty-two in the U.S., shifting 23,000 equivalent album units in its first week of release, marking the biggest sales week for a Latin album by a woman since Shakira's El Dorado in 2017. It also debuted atop the Billboard Top Latin Albums chart, becoming the first album by a woman to do so, also since 2017's El Dorado. The EP received universal acclaim according to Metacritic, a website collecting reviews from professional music critics, and was nominated for Best Latin Pop Album at the 64th Annual Grammy Awards. It also received Latin Pop Album of the Year nominations from the Billboard Latin Music, Latin American Music and Lo Nuestro award ceremonies. The record blends reggaeton, Latin pop, R&B genres with urbano elements, marking a departure from the dance-pop sound of its predecessor, Rare. Gomez's expansion of her artistry was praised; AllMusic's Matt Collar found her remaining "artistically fearless". Entertainment Weeklys Marcus Jones called her "a far more versatile musician than she's been given credit for". It spawned three singles: "De Una Vez", "Baila Conmigo" with Rauw Alejandro, and "Selfish Love" with DJ Snake. With this EP and the single "Baila Conmigo", she became the first female act to top the US Latin Albums and Latin Airplay charts simultaneously in over a decade. The music video for "De Una Vez" was nominated for Best Short Form Music Video at the 22nd Annual Latin Grammy Awards. Gomez performed at the 2021 UEFA Champions League Final opening ceremony in May. She later collaborated with Colombian singer Camilo in a song titled "999".

Gomez starred in and executive produced the Hulu mystery-comedy series Only Murders in the Building alongside Steve Martin and Martin Short, which premiered on Hulu in August 2021, and set the record for the most-watched comedy premiere in Hulu history. Ahead of the official premiere of the series, Gomez revealed that she was happy to have played a character that matched her current actual age, saying that she "signed [her] life away" to The Walt Disney Company at the start of her career and that she "did not know what she was doing." The series has received critical acclaim, and numerous accolades. The performances and chemistry among the main trio were praised by critics; Richard Roeper of the Chicago Sun-Times wrote: "Gomez is a true co-star in the series and does a superb job of meshing with Martin and Short to form one of the more entertaining albeit unlikely friendship trios in recent memory." 
Gomez won the Satellite Award for Best Actress – Television Series Musical or Comedy, while nominated for the Critics' Choice Television Award, the Golden Globe Award for Best Actress in a Comedy Series, and two times for the Screen Actors Guild Award for Outstanding Performance by an Ensemble in a Comedy Series. She won two times the People's Choice Award for Comedy TV Star of the Year. At the 74th Primetime Emmy Awards, she was nominated as a producer for Outstanding Comedy Series, marking only the third time a Latina has ever been among the producing nominees for comedy series in the awards' history. Several journalists expressed disappointment over her failure to receive an Emmy nomination for Outstanding Lead Actress in a Comedy Series. Her co-stars, Steve Martin and Martin Short released a statement saying, "We’re a little dismayed that Selena didn’t get nominated because she’s so crucial to the trio, to the show. She kind of balances us."

In 2022, Gomez reprised the voice role of Mavis, and also served as an executive producer, for the fourth and final installment in the Hotel Transylvania franchise, Hotel Transylvania: Transformania. In response to the rising cases of the SARS-CoV-2 Delta variant in the United States, Sony Pictures cancelled the film's theatrical plans. The film was released on Amazon Prime Video in January 2022 to mixed reviews. Gomez was nominated as executive producer for a Children's and Family Emmy Award. She collaborated with British band Coldplay on "Let Somebody Go", released as a single in February. For her work as featured artist on Coldplay's ninth studio album, Music of the Spheres, she was nominated for Album of the Year at the 65th Annual Grammy Awards. In May, Gomez hosted an episode of the NBC late-night sketch comedy Saturday Night Live. She later made a cameo appearance on the show in December. In August, Gomez featured in a remix of Rema's song, "Calm Down". The song was an international success, peaking at number three on the Billboard Global 200. The remix peaked at number fifteen in the U.S., and reached number three in Canada.

Gomez was the focus of the Alek Keshishian-directed "raw and intimate" documentary film, Selena Gomez: My Mind & Me. The film premiered at the AFI Fest in November 2022, and was released two days after on Apple TV+ and in select movie theaters. It was met with a positive critical reception upon release; the documentary was praised for mental health transparency. Chris Azzopardi from The New York Times described it as "honest portrait study of stardom and mental illness". The film received the Seal of Female Empowerment in Entertainment by the Critics Choice Association. Gomez released the song "My Mind & Me" to coincide with the release of the documentary. The song received "Film Song of the Year" honor by Variety in 2022.

Gomez filming the season 3 of Only Murders in the Building in January 2023. In March 2023, Gomez appeared in the Apple TV+ documentary television series Dear.... 

Upcoming projects
In October 2020, it was announced that Gomez is set to produce, and possible star, in the horror thriller film Dollhouse. In November 2020, Gomez was announced as executive producer and star of the Elgin James-directed biographical film In the Shadow of the Mountain, based on the memoir of Silvia Vasquez-Lavado, the first openly gay woman to complete the Seven Summits. In April 2021, Gomez was also set to star in the psychological thriller Spiral. In March 2022, a project inspired by Sixteen Candles titled 15 Candles entered development for Peacock, with Gomez serving as executive producer. In August, it was announced that Gomez is in talks to produce a reboot of Working Girl on Hulu. In November, Gomez revealed that she will be taking Spanish lessons for a "Spanish-language movie" she will start filming in the summer of 2023; the film is rumored to be Emila Perez, directed by Jacques Audiard. She also revealed that she was working on her next album. In December, Gomez was announced as producer of the music documentary Won’t Be Silent.

Artistry
Musical style
Gomez is described as a pop artist with a mezzo-soprano vocal range. Her work is primarily characterised as dance-popSources:
 
 
 
  and EDM; however, she has experimented with different music genres. Her debut album with the Scene was influenced by electronic rock and pop rock, while her subsequent records with the band opted for a dance-pop sound. A Year Without Rain noted synth-pop characteristics, and When the Sun Goes Down featured a more electropop and electro-disco musical direction. Her debut solo album Stars Dance was rooted in the EDM-pop genre—Gomez herself described it as "baby dubstep"—drawing elements from electronic, disco, techno, and dancehall. Her songs "The Heart Wants What It Wants" and "Good for You" have been described as "minimalistic" and "grown-up", introducing a more adult pop sound into her repertoire.

Influences
Early in her career, Gomez cited Bruno Mars as an influence for "his style of music, his style in general, the way he performs, the way he carries himself". Gomez has also cited Christina Aguilera, Britney Spears, Beyoncé, Rihanna, and Taylor Swift as influences. Gomez's debut solo album Stars Dance (2013) was prominently influenced by Spears, Swift, and EDM producer Skrillex; her second album, Revival, was mainly inspired by Aguilera's album Stripped (2002), as well as Janet Jackson and Spears.

Products and endorsements
In 2009, Gomez was part of Sears's back-to-school fashion campaign and featured in television commercials. She hosted the "Sears Arrive Air Band Casting Call" to select five winners for the first-ever "Sears Air Band" to perform at the 2009 MTV Video Music Awards. She also became the spokesperson for Borden Milk and starred in campaign's print ads and television commercials for the brand.

Having previously announced plans to launch a fashion line, Gomez released the Dream Out Loud collection in 2010. It consisted of bohemian dresses, floral tops, jeans, skirts, jackets, scarves and hats, all of which were made from recycled or eco-friendly materials. Gomez stated, "With my line, I really want to give the customer options on how they can put their own looks together [...] I want the pieces that can be easy to dress up or down, and the fabrics being eco-friendly and organic is super important [...] Also, the tags will all have some of my inspirational quotes on them. I'm just looking to send a good message." Gomez teamed up with designers Tony Melillo and Sandra Campos for the project, both of whom had previously worked with big-name fashion houses. Melillo and Campos teamed with New York-based Adjmi Apparel to manufacture the brand, which was formed by Adjmi CH Brands LLC, the holding company for the brand. From 2010 to 2014, Gomez worked with retailer Kmart to release the clothing line.

It was announced on July 14, 2011, that Gomez had signed a license agreement with Adrenalina, an extreme sports and adventure-themed lifestyle brand, to develop, manufacture, and distribute her own fragrance. Chairman and CEO of Adrenalina, Ilia Lekach, said, "We are incredibly enthused to be working with Ms. Gomez and will reveal more details pertaining to the fragrance as we get closer to the launch date." The perfume was released in May 2012. In 2013, she released her second fragrance, Vivamore by Selena Gomez. She also created her own collection of nail polish colors for Nicole by OPI.

From 2013 to 2015, Gomez was a spokesperson and partner for Neo by Adidas. In 2015, Gomez signed $3 million endorsement deal with Pantene. In 2016, Gomez appeared in a fashion campaign for luxury brand Louis Vuitton. She also appeared in ads for Coca-Cola's "Share a Coke" campaign, and advertisements for the campaign and lyrics from two of her songs were featured on Coca-Cola packaging nationwide. In 2017, Gomez confirmed her collaboration with Coach, beginning with their fall line, thereby becoming the new face of the brand and earning $10 million. The limited-edition collection of handbags was called the "Selena Grace" line. Gomez's second collection and "first ever ready-to-wear collection for Coach", named Coach X Selena Gomez, included clothing, outerwear, and bags. That year, Gomez signed a $30 million contract with the athletic brand Puma as brand ambassador, appearing in campaigns such as those for the Phenom Lux sneakers released in March. Her collection with Puma, called SG x PUMA Strong Girl collection, launched on December 12 of that year and contained products from sneakers to athleisure attire. It was also reported in 2018 that Gomez had been earning $800,000 for each sponsored Instagram post.

In April 2020, Gomez became an owner and investor of the ice cream brand Serendipity. In September, she launched her own makeup line, "Rare Beauty". The makeup line was named Startup of the Year at the 2020 WWD Beauty Inc Awards. In November 2021, Gomez cofounded the mental health media platform "Wondermind". She is also an investor in the food delivery company Gopuff. In May 2022, she also collaborated with Our Place on a cookware line.

Philanthropy
UNICEF

In October 2008, Gomez participated in St. Jude's Children's Hospital's "Runway For Life" benefit. That same month, Gomez was named UNICEF's spokesperson for the Trick-or-Treat for UNICEF campaign, which encouraged children to raise money on Halloween to help children around the world. In August 2009, Gomez, then 17 years old, became the youngest UNICEF ambassador (Millie Bobby Brown later surpassed this record). In her first official field mission, Gomez traveled to Ghana in September 2009 for one week to witness first-hand the stark conditions of vulnerable children that lack vital necessities such as clean water, nourishment, education and healthcare. Gomez explained in an interview with Associated Press correspondents that she wanted to use her star power to bring awareness to Ghana: "That's why I feel very honored to have a voice that kids listen to and take into consideration [...] I had people on my tour asking me where IS Ghana, and they Googled it [...] and because I went there, they now know where Ghana is. So it's pretty incredible." Gomez said, of her role as ambassador, that "Every day 25,000 children die from preventable causes. I stand with UNICEF in the belief that we can change that number from 25,000 to zero. I know we can achieve this because every moment, UNICEF is on the ground providing children with the lifesaving assistance needed to ensure zero becomes a reality."

Gomez was named spokesperson for UNICEF's 2009 Trick-or-Treat campaign for the second year in a row. She raised over $700,000 for the charity in 2008 and stated that she hopes to be able to raise US$1 million in 2009. Gomez participated in a celebrity auction and hosted a live web cast series on Facebook in support of the Trick-or-Treat campaign. She returned as the UNICEF spokesperson for the 60th anniversary of Trick-or-Treat for UNICEF campaign in 2010. In celebration of the organization's 60th anniversary, Gomez and the Scene held a benefit concert, donating all proceeds to the campaign.

In February 2011, Gomez traveled to Chile to meet with the families of the UNICEF-supported "Programa Puente", which helped families better understand and develop skills to deal with early childhood education, development, and other issues related to raising children. Gomez remarked that "UNICEF is helping Chilean families get out of poverty, prevent violence within the home and promote education. To witness first hand these families' struggles, and also their hope and perseverance, was truly inspiring". In March, Gomez participated in the UNICEF Tap Project's "Celebrity Tap Pack" which featured limited-edition, custom-made water bottles with tap water from the homes of each celebrity advocate to raise funds and increase profile for the clean water and sanitation programs. She was also featured in videos that promoted the campaign. The campaign raised $900,000.

In January 2012, Gomez held her second charity concert, which raised more than $200,000 to help UNICEF proved children around the world with life-saving therapeutic foods, medicines, clean water, education, and immunization. In 2014, Gomez visited Nepal to raise awareness for children in need. A UNICEF ambassador since 2009, Gomez has played an active role in advocating for the world's "most vulnerable children" by participating in several campaigns, events, and initiatives on behalf of the organization. In June 2021, Gomez signed a UNICEF open letter urging the G7 "to donate more coronavirus vaccines to the international COVAX initiative."

Other charity work
Gomez was involved in the UR Votes Count campaign, which encouraged teenagers to learn more about 2008 presidential candidates Barack Obama and John McCain. The following year, Gomez became the ambassador of DoSomething after being involved with the charity Island Dog, which helped dogs in Puerto Rico. Gomez updated fans on her blog at MySpace: "We are spending the day feeding puppies, washing them and hanging out with them. After we spend the day with them we are sending these dogs to different places in the U.S the no-kill dog shelters so they can find a home […]." She joined while filming Wizards of Waverly Place: The Movie in Puerto Rico. Gomez has also been involved with the charity RAISE Hope For Congo, an initiative of the Enough Project, to help raise awareness for conflict minerals and violence against Congolese women.

From 2009 to 2012, Gomez was involved in "Disney's Friends for Change", an organization which promoted "environmentally-friendly behavior", and appeared in its public service announcements. Gomez, Demi Lovato, Miley Cyrus, and the Jonas Brothers recorded the charity single "Send It On" as the ad hoc musical team "Disney's Friends For Change", all of whose proceeds were donated into the Disney Worldwide Conservation Fund. The song debuted on the Billboard Hot 100 at number 20. In April 2012, Gomez was named ambassador to the Ryan Seacrest Foundation. The year before, Gomez made an appearance at The Children's Hospital of Philadelphia during a Ryan Seacrest Foundation broadcast from the hospital's multimedia center. She was also a spokesperson for State Farm Insurance and appeared in numerous television commercials, which aired on the Disney Channel, to raise awareness of being a safe driver. Gomez provided the narration for Girl Rising (2013), a CNN documentary film, which focused on the power of female education as it followed seven girls around the world who sought to overcome obstacles and follow their dreams.

Gomez attended the We Day California youth empowerment event in Los Angeles in 2018 and 2019. During the 2018 event, Gomez introduced Nellie Mainor, a young fan who had a rare kidney disease. Her participation in We Day 2019 was her first appearance after an extended break from the spotlight. Gomez continued her partnership with WE Charity when she traveled to Kenya in December 2019 to meet the local community and visit schools built by the organization.

During the 2019–20 Australian bushfire season, Gomez made a donation to fight Australia wildfires and urged followers to do the same. In 2020, she created the Rare Impact Fund by Rare Beauty to help "young people gain access to mental health resources", and is committed to raise US$100 million over the next ten years. For each episode of her HBO Max cooking show Selena + Chef, the show donates $10,000 to the charity of the Chef's choice, often food related. In 2021, over two seasons of the show, $360,000 was raised for nonprofit organizations.

 Impact and advocacy 
Gomez has been referred to as "Dance-pop Princess" by several media outlets, and various journalists regard her as a "triple threat", owing to her successful singing, performing, and acting careers. The Guardian credits her with popularizing "whisper pop", a style of pop music characterized by soft, hushed and breathy vocals. In 2017, Time magazine honored her as one of the "women who are changing the world" on its First Women Leaders list. In 2020, Gomez received the Art Award from Hispanic Heritage Foundation for her impact on global culture via her music, filmography and advocacy. In 2022, People named Gomez as one of 15 women who are "changing the music industry today". Variety considers her a key personality in global media, owing to her "multi-hyphenate" presence incorporating music, films, television, cosmetics, and social activism. Gomez was also included in [[Power 100|The Hollywood Reporters Power 100]] list as one of the most powerful women in entertainment.

Gomez advocates for various causes. She is known for frequently raising awareness on mental health. In 2019, she received the McLean Award for mental health advocacy. The Stanford Healthcare Innovation Lab honored her with the first ever Mental Health Innovations Award for Excellence in Mental Health Advocacy in 2022. That year, she also received the Morton E. Ruderman Award in Inclusion by the Ruderman Family Foundation. Gomez has shown support for the LGBT community. She joined numerous celebrities to write a "love letter" during pride month, as a part of Billboards 30 Days of Pride during the month of June 2016. She also collaborated with 23 other artists for the charity single "Hands", a tribute for the victims of the Pulse nightclub shooting, to raise funds for Equality Florida's Pulse Victims Fund, GLAAD, and the GLBT Community Center of Central Florida. That year, she donated proceeds of her Revival Tour concert in North Carolina to fight the state's recent legislation known as the "bathroom law;" The law, repealed in 2017, required people to use public restrooms in line with their birth gender unless they had fully transitioned.

Gomez is a critic of racism and supported the Black Lives Matter movement, lending her Instagram account to Alicia Garza, co-creator of Black Lives Matter and one of the founders of Black Futures Lab, in June 2020. In May 2021, Gomez participated in the VAX Live: The Concert to Reunite the World concert organized by Global Citizen to promote the distribution of COVID-19 vaccines worldwide through the COVAX program. The event urged people to ask their governments to pledge $22.1 billion in aid to the vaccine distribution. In the wake of the Alabama abortion ban in May 2019, Gomez spoke out on Instagram in favor of abortion rights in the United States. Amidst Roe v. Wade being overturned in June 2022, Gomez stated she is "not happy" and that "men need to stand up and also speak against this issue. It's also the amount of women that are hurting." In May 2022, MTV partnered with Gomez and the Rare Impact Fund by Rare Beauty to host the Mental Health Youth Action Forum at the White House in coordination with the Biden-Harris Administration.

Personal life
Property
Gomez owned a $6.6 million mansion in Calabasas, Los Angeles. In 2014, she sold her mansion in Tarzana, Los Angeles for $3.5 million. In 2015, she purchased a mansion in Fort Worth, Texas for $3.5 million, in October 2018 the mansion was sold. In 2020, Gomez moved to a $5 million mansion in the Los Angeles neighborhood of Encino. In the same year, she sold her house in Studio City, Los Angeles for $2.3 million.

Religious beliefs
Gomez was raised Catholic. At age 13, she wanted a purity ring, and her father went to the church and had it blessed. She has said, "He actually used me as an example for other kids: I'm going to keep my promise to myself, to my family and to God." Gomez stopped wearing the ring in 2010. In 2017, she said she did not like the term "religion" and that sometimes it "freaks me out," adding, "I don't know if it's necessarily that I believe in religion as much as I believe in faith and a relationship with God." In 2014, Gomez said that she listened to "Oceans (Where Feet May Fail)" by Hillsong United before performing at the 2014 American Music Awards. In 2016, she appeared at a Hillsong Young & Free concert in Los Angeles, leading worship by singing her song "Nobody". When a fan on Twitter asked her who the lyrics to "Nobody" refer to, Gomez replied that they refer to God. She also covered Hillsong Worship's song "Transfiguration" during her Revival Tour. , she attends a different congregation in California, the Hillsong Church, and has said that she does not consider herself religious, but is more concerned with her faith and connection to God.

Health
Gomez was diagnosed with lupus sometime between 2012 and early 2014. In September 2017, she revealed on Instagram that she had withdrawn from public events during the previous few months because she had received a kidney transplant from actress and friend Francia Raisa.Petti, Stephanie (September 14, 2017). "Selena Gomez Reveals She Is Recovering from a Kidney Transplant – and Her Best Friend Was the Donor!" People. During the transplant, an artery broke and emergency surgery was conducted to build a new artery using a vein from her leg.

Gomez has been open about her struggles with both anxiety and depression. She began pursuing therapy in her early twenties and also spent time in treatment facilities. When she reached 100 million Instagram followers, Gomez said she "sort of freaked out" and has since taken several extended breaks from social media, due in part to negative comments. In April 2020, she revealed she has bipolar disorder.

In October 2022, Gomez canceled an appearance on The Tonight Show with Jimmy Fallon after testing positive for COVID-19. In November 2022, she revealed that she had an episode of psychosis in 2018.

Relationships
Gomez dated singer Nick Jonas from 2008 to 2009. She appeared in the music video for his band's song "Burnin' Up". From December 2010 to March 2018, Gomez was in an on-again, off-again relationship with Canadian singer Justin Bieber. In 2015, she began dating Russian-German DJ Zedd shortly after recording their song "I Want You to Know". They broke up later that year. In January 2017, Gomez began dating Canadian singer-songwriter the Weeknd. They moved in together temporarily later on in September, but broke up a month later. Gomez regards Taylor Swift as her "only" friend in the industry; they have expressed their admiration for each other numerous times in the media since 2008, and their friendship has been widely covered by news outlets.

 Accolades and achievements 

Gomez has won an American Music Award, 16 Guinness World Records, an iHeartRadio Music Award, six Latin American Music Awards, a MTV Video Music Award, two MTV Movie & TV Awards, and four People's Choice Awards. For her music work, she was nominated for two Grammy Awards, seven Billboard Music Awards, and a Latin Grammy Award. For her acting work, she won a Satellite Awards, and was nominated for a Critics' Choice Television Award, a Golden Globe Award, three NAACP Image Awards, and two Screen Actors Guild Award. She also received a nomination as a producer at the 74th Primetime Emmy Awards for Outstanding Comedy Series, marking only the third time a Latina has ever been among the producing nominees for comedy series in the awards' history. With 18 wins, Gomez is the fourth-most awarded solo artist at the Teen Choice Awards. She currently holds the record for the most Kids' Choice Awards wins (11) for an individual.

In 2015, Gomez was honored with the Chart-Topper Award at the Billboard Women in Music event. In 2016, she became the first person to reach 100 million followers on Instagram. That year, she was named to Forbes' 30 Under 30 list in the music category, and again in 2020 in its "All-Star Alumni" category. In 2017, she was named Billboard Woman of the Year. In 2019, Billboard placed her 38th on its Top Artists of the 2010s Chart. Gomez has topped three three consecutive times the Billboard 200 and one time the Billboard Hot 100. In addition, she was awarded the McLean Award for mental health advocacy. Time included Gomez on its annual list of the 100 most influential people in 2020. She was also honored as one of the Leading Ladies of Entertainment by The Latin Recording Academy, and received the Art Award from Hispanic Heritage Foundation for her impact on global culture via her music, filmography and advocacy.

Filmography

According to the review aggregator site Rotten Tomatoes, Gomez's most critically acclaimed television and film projects include The Suite Life of Zack & Cody (2006), Hannah Montana (2007), Wizards of Waverly Place (2007–2012), Another Cinderella Story (2008), Princess Protection Program (2009), Ramona and Beezus (2010), The Muppets (2011), Spring Breakers (2012), Hotel Transylvania (2012–2022), Girl Rising (2013), The Wizards Return: Alex vs. Alex (2013), Rudderless (2014), The Fundamentals of Caring (2016), Neighbors 2: Sorority Rising (2016), The Dead Don't Die (2019), A Rainy Day in New York (2019), Selena + Chef (2020–2022), and Only Murders in the Building (2021–present).

Gomez also executive produced the television series 13 Reasons Why (2017–2020) and Living Undocumented (2019).

Discography

Selena Gomez & the Scene albums
 Kiss & Tell (2009)
 A Year Without Rain (2010)
 When the Sun Goes Down (2011)

Solo albums
 Stars Dance (2013)
 Revival (2015)
 Rare'' (2020)

Tours

Selena Gomez & the Scene tours

 Live in Concert (2009–2010)
 A Year Without Rain Tour (2010–2011)
 We Own the Night Tour (2011–2012)

Solo tours
 Stars Dance Tour (2013–2014)
 Revival Tour (2016)

See also
 List of artists who reached number one in the United States
 List of artists who reached number one on the Billboard Mainstream Top 40 chart
 List of most-followed Instagram accounts
 List of artists who reached number one on the U.S. dance chart
 List of Billboard Social 50 number-one artists
 History of Mexican Americans in Dallas–Fort Worth

Footnotes

Explanations

References

External links

 
 

 
1992 births
21st-century American actresses
21st-century American singers
21st-century American women singers
Actresses from Texas
American child actresses
American child singers
American dance musicians
American electronic musicians
American film actresses
American people of Italian descent
American people of Mexican descent
American philanthropists
American pop rock singers
American television actresses
American voice actresses
American women in electronic music
American women pop singers
Child pop musicians
Dance-pop musicians
Hispanic and Latino American actresses
Hispanic and Latino American singers
Hollywood Records artists
Interscope Records artists
Kidney transplant recipients
American LGBT rights activists
Living people
People from Grand Prairie, Texas
People with bipolar disorder
People with lupus
Shorty Award winners
Singers from Texas
UNICEF Goodwill Ambassadors
YouTube channels launched in 2008
Women in Latin music